Magno Malta (born October 16, 1957) is a Brazilian evangelical pastor, religious singer, and politician. He has represented Espírito Santo in the Federal Senate from 2003 to 2019 and was re-elected for a separate term that began in 2023. He is a member of the Liberal Party and is a staunch ally of President Jair Bolsonaro.

Previously he was city councillor in Cachoeiro de Itapemirim, serving as a member of PTB, a State Deputy from Espírito Santo from 1995 to 2003, serving as a member of the MDB, and a Federal Deputy from Espírito Santo from 1999 to 2003, serving as a member of the short-lived Social Labor Party before it merged with the Liberal Party. Since 2007, he has been involved in many scandals including embezzlement, nepotism, bribing and emission of fake bill of goods. Some of these accusations are believed to be the cause of his loss in the 2018 Senate election, placing third.

References

Living people
1957 births
Members of the Federal Senate (Brazil)
People from Bahia
Members of the Chamber of Deputies (Brazil) from Espírito Santo
Members of the Legislative Assembly of Espírito Santo
Protestantism in Brazil
Brazilian evangelicals
Brazilian anti-communists
Evangelical pastors
Brazilian clergy
Conservatism in Brazil
20th-century Protestant religious leaders
21st-century Protestant religious leaders
Liberal Party (Brazil, 2006) politicians